Cedartree Lake, is a lake just north of Nestor Falls, Ontario, Canada, in the township of Sioux Narrows-Nestor Falls and is fed by Kakagi Lake.  It is also feeds Lake of the Woods through a series of lakes starting with Flint Lake.

See also
List of lakes in Ontario

References 

Lakes of Kenora District